is a railway station on the Osaka Metro Nagahori Tsurumi-ryokuchi Line and Sennichimae Line in Nishi-ku, Osaka, Japan.

Lines

 (Station Number: N13)
 (Station Number: S14)

Layout

Sennichimae Line

Nagahori Tsurumi-ryokuchi Line

Railway stations in Osaka Prefecture
Railway stations in Japan opened in 1969
Osaka Metro stations